Arabis blepharophylla is a species of flowering plant in the family Brassicaceae, known by the common names coast rock cress and rose rock cress. It is endemic to California, growing mostly in the San Francisco Bay Area and nearby low-elevation California Coast Ranges.

This herbaceous perennial that sends up thin, hairy stems from a basal rosette of fuzzy leaves. It bears small flowers with four bright purplish-pink petals.

Uncommon in the wild, it is often grown as an attractive, sweet-scented flowering garden plant. There are several cultivars bred for garden use. The cultivar 'Frühlingszauber' has received the Royal Horticultural Society's Award of Garden Merit.

See also
 List of Arabis species

References

External links

Jepson Manual Treatment
USDA Plants Profile
The Nature Conservancy
Photo gallery

blepharophylla
Endemic flora of California
Natural history of the California Coast Ranges
Garden plants of North America